Unidad Educativa Juan XXIII (U.E.P Italo – Venezolano "Juan XXIII") is a private, Italo-Venezuelan school, of preschool, primary and secondary education, located in Cabimas, Venezuela.

References 

Catholic schools in Venezuela
Cabimas